Hoddinott is a surname. Notable people with this surname include:

Alun Hoddinott (1929–2008), Welsh classical composer
Diana Hoddinott (born 1945), English actress
Frank Hoddinott (1894–1980), Welsh association footballer
John Hoddinott (economist) (born 1961), Canadian economist
John Hoddinott (1944–2001), British police officer
Robbie Hoddinott, member of Kingfish (band)